In Chile, an election for the members of the Constitutional Council is scheduled to be held on May 7, 2023. This election comes in response to the rejection of a proposed constitutional draft in a national referendum held in September 2022. Following the defeat of the draft, a multiparty agreement was reached to restart the process, which was subsequently ratified by Congress via a constitutional amendment.

The new Constitutional Council will be modeled after the Senate and will consist of 50 members who will be elected by regions. Additionally, the council will have an equal number of men and women. The convention will be chosen through a mandatory vote in April 2023.

Background 

On September 4, 2022, a national plebiscite known as the "exit plebiscite" was held to determine whether voters agreed with the new Political Constitution of the Republic drafted by the Constitutional Convention. However, the proposed constitution was rejected by a margin of 62% to 38%. Therefore, the current 1980 Constitution will continue to be in effect.

Agreement for Chile 
Lawmakers announced the "Agreement for Chile" in December 2022, as a second attempt to draft a new constitution with different rules. The agreement states that a group of 50 directly-elected constitutional advisors will draft the constitution based on a preliminary draft prepared by a commission of 24 experts appointed by Congress. Additionally, a 14-member body appointed by Congress will ensure that the proposed text aligns with the 12 institutional and fundamental principles outlined in the agreement.

Council members will be directly elected in April, with equal representation of men and women and the participation of indigenous peoples. A three-fifths majority vote in the Council will be required to approve articles, which is lower than the two-thirds majority required in the previous convention. Unlike the previous convention, the number of seats reserved for indigenous representatives will not be fixed; rather, it will depend on the number of votes they receive.

The commission will work on the first draft from March 6 to June 6, and the Constitutional Council will commence its work thirty days after its election on June 6, 2023. The council must deliver the draft constitution by November 6, and a mandatory referendum will be held on December 17, 2023.

The agreement was reached on 12 December 2022 and ratified by Congress a month later, with the Republican Party and the Party of the People not participating.

Contesting parties and coalitions

Opinion polls

Notes

References

Elections in Chile
Chile
Chilean Constitutional Convention
Presidency of Gabriel Boric